Johannes VI Ambundii, Archbishopric of Riga 1418-1424, secular name Johannes Ambundii de Swan, also Abundi, Ambundij, Habundi, Habendi, Habindi, Almanni and ~ von Schwan (born 1384; died 16 June 1424) was a German ecclesiastic.  Ambundii is thought to be born in the area of Stettin (Szczecin) in Pomerania.  He studied at the Juristical University of Prague, and graduated in 1391.  Later, he got his doctor in theology and canonical law.

Career
From 1394–1399 he was general vicar of the bishop of Bamberg.  In 1401, he was general vicar in Speyer, and in 1408 general vicar in Würzburg.

In 1412, he visited the Scottish convent of St. Ägidius in Nuremberg, by order of the bishop of Bamberg.  He was canon of the church of Eichstädt and provost of Herriden in 1414 or 1415 and as such took part at the Council of Constance.  On 27 November 1416 he was elected bishop of Chur and affirmed by the archbishop of Mainz, Johann II. Shortly afterwards, Ambundii returned to the council.

At this time, Italy, France and Spain demanded the immediate election of the pope, while the Holy Roman Empire preferred to first initiate the reform of the Church.  Ambundii convinced Emperor Sigismund to give priority to the election.

On 11 July 1418 Pope Martin V by recommendation of the Emperor nominated Johannes Ambundii to the position of Archbishopric of Riga where he stayed until 1424. In Riga Ambundii initiated the establishment of the Livonian Confederation.

On 13 October 1418 Ambundii participated in the negotiations between the State of the Teutonic Order and the Kingdom of Poland in Wileny.

Ambundii was unhappy with his new office in the far north.  The German brothers from the order deemed him a bitter and scant man, which is not a laudable trait for great men as a chaplain said.  It was seen with anxiety that Ambundii was a counselor of the Emperor and considered his favorite.  The order tried to acquire Livonia as independent property from the Emperor and feared Ambundii would act in opposition to the efforts.  In fact, it was caused by him that the chapter of Riga asked the pope to revoke the Bulle Bonifacii IX, which incorporated the Church of Riga to the order.

In 1421 he acted as papal delegated judge in a quarrel between the king of Sweden and the bishop of Uppsala.  In 1422 he organized a council of the Prussian bishops, but it did not take place.

References

 Allgemeine Deutsche Biographie: at Wikisource :de:s:ADB:Johann VI. Ambundii
 Regesta Imperii, University of Giessen - online version

14th-century births
1424 deaths
15th-century Roman Catholic archbishops in Livonia
Clergy from Szczecin
Archbishops of Riga
Prince-bishops in Livonia
Bishops of Chur
Prince-bishops in the Holy Roman Empire